Mane Belagida Sose is a 1973 Indian Kannada-language film. The film stars Vishnuvardhan, Aarathi, Bharathi and Ramgopal. The film's musical score is by Vijaya Bhaskar.

Cast
Vishnuvardhan
Aarathi
Bharathi
Ramgopal
Dwarakish

Soundtrack

Reception

References

External links
 

1970s Kannada-language films
Films scored by Vijaya Bhaskar